Woodmasonia is a monotypic genus of phasmids belonging to the family Phasmatidae. The only species is Woodmasonia oxytenes, recorded from Myanmar.

References

Phasmatidae
Monotypic insect genera